Nandita Adhiya (born 6 January 1978) is a Gujarati cricketer. She played for Saurashtra women and West Zone women.  She has played 27 Limited over matches and 10 Women's Twenty20.

References

Saurashtra women cricketers
West Zone women cricketers
1978 births
People from Gujarat
Living people